Olyushinskaya is a rural locality (a village) in Nizhneslobodskoye Rural Settlement, Vozhegodsky District, Vologda Oblast, Russia. The population was 35 as of 2002.

Geography 
Olyushinskaya is located 45 km east of Vozhega (the district's administrative centre) by road. Yeskinskaya is the nearest rural locality.

References 

Rural localities in Vozhegodsky District